Central Lawrenceville is a neighborhood in the northeast of Pittsburgh, Pennsylvania in the United States.  It has a zip code of 15201, and has representation on Pittsburgh City Council by the council member for District 7 (North Central East Neighborhoods). It is home to Allegheny Cemetery.  Central Lawrenceville is the home of the Pittsburgh Bureau of Fire's 6 Engine and 6 Truck.

Surrounding and adjacent neighborhoods
Central Lawrenceville has five land borders with the Pittsburgh neighborhoods of Upper Lawrenceville to the north, Stanton Heights to the east and northeast, Garfield to the southeast, Bloomfield to the south, and Lower Lawrenceville to the southwest.  Across the Allegheny River to the northwest, Central Lawrenceville runs adjacent with Millvale (with a direct connector via 40th Street Bridge) and Shaler Township.

City Steps
While the Central Lawrenceville neighborhood only has one distinct flight of city steps - it's an essential one for connecting residents to two popular amenities. In Central Lawrenceville, the Government Way Steps of Pittsburgh provides easy access between the Carnegie Public Library Lawrenceville branch and Arsenal Park. These sidewalk steps provide a safe passage for walkers of all ages.

References

Further reading

External links
Lawrenceville United: an inclusive, resident-driven, non-profit organization that works to improve the quality of life for all Lawrenceville residents.

See also
Lawrenceville (Pittsburgh)
List of Pittsburgh neighborhoods

Neighborhoods in Pittsburgh
Economy of Pittsburgh
Pittsburgh History & Landmarks Foundation Historic Landmarks